Frank Anthony LoVuolo (May 1, 1924 – December 17, 2018) was an American football end who played one season for the New York Giants. He played college football at the St. Bonaventure University, having previously attended North High School in his hometown of Binghamton. He died in December 2018 at the age of 94.

References

1924 births
2018 deaths
American football ends
New York Giants players
Players of American football from New York (state)
Sportspeople from Binghamton, New York
St. Bonaventure Brown Indians football players